Cewe is a German printing company based in Oldenburg, Lower Saxony. It's the largest photo printing company in Europe and was founded in 1961.

The company has expanded through acquisitions of competing and similar companies, for example Laserline, Viaprinto, Pixum and Saxoprint.

Apart from its first party sales through app and website, Cewe produces photo products for other companies in the background, including the two largest drug stores in Germany (dm and Rossmann) and a range of large retail chains.

In addition to the company headquarters in Oldenburg, Cewe has production sites in Germany in Mönchengladbach, Eschbach near Freiburg, Germering near Munich, Dresden, Berlin and Münster. In other European countries, Cewe has locations in the Czech Republic (Prague), France (Rennes, Montpellier), Poland (Kędzierzyn-Koźle in Upper Silesia), România (Bucharest), Hungary (Budapest) and the United Kingdom (Warwick).

References

External links 
 Company website

Photography companies of Germany
Companies established in 1961
1961 establishments in West Germany